Chahar Rah Beheshti Sapu (also Romanized as Chahār Rāh Bheshtī Sapū) is a village in Dehdasht-e Sharqi Rural District, in the Central District of Kohgiluyeh County, Kohgiluyeh and Boyer-Ahmad Province, Iran. At the 2006 census, its population was 171, in 29 families.

References 

Populated places in Kohgiluyeh County